Newborn or new born most commonly refers to an infant, a baby in the first days or weeks after birth.

Newborn or new born may also refer to:

People
 Newborn (surname)

Places
 Newborn, Georgia, town in the United States

Politics
 The Newborn monument, a celebration of the 2008 Kosovo declaration of independence

Music
 New Born (rapper)
 Newborn (band), Hungarian punk bank

Albums
 Newborn, unreleased album by Weerd Science
 Newborn (album), album by the James Gang
 The Newborn EP, EP by Elbow

Songs
 Newborn (Elbow song), song by Elbow
 "New Born", song by Muse
"Newborn", the B-side of the Depeche Mode single A Pain That I'm Used To

See also